Modi is a village located on the northern shore of Western Crete, 15 kilometers north of Chania, and part of the Chania regional unit.

References

Sources
Greece.com - Modi
Google Maps

Populated places in Chania (regional unit)